Highercliff is a hamlet in the parish of Duloe, Cornwall, England].

References

Hamlets in Cornwall